was a professional wrestling event promoted by World Wonder Ring Stardom. The event took place on May 5, 2022, in Fukuoka, Japan at the Fukuoka Convention Center, with a limited attendance due in part to the ongoing COVID-19 pandemic at the time.

Storylines
After she successfully defended the World of Stardom Championship against Giulia at Stardom World Climax 2022 on March 26, Syuri announced her departure from Donna Del Mondo to create a new stable which was later named as God's Eye, with Mirai and Ami Sourei being the first two recruits that Syuri aligned herself with. The new unit's leader stated that God's Eye will number one more member on May 5, where they will face Donna Del Mondo in an elimination tag team match. On the first night of the 2022 Cinderella Tournament from April 3, Saya Kamitani and Maika went into a double diqsualification after they eliminated themselves simultaneously over the top rope. The 2021's edition of the tournament finalists were set to collide on May 5 for Kamitani's "White belt" after Maika issued a challenge.

Event
The show featured total of seven professional wrestling matches that resulted from scripted storylines, where wrestlers portrayed villains, heroes, or less distinguishable characters in the scripted events that built tension and culminated in a wrestling match or series of matches. The event will be the pay-per-view and largest show of the "Stardom Golden Week Fight Tour" series of smaller events which will take place between May 1 and 8, 2022. The event's press conference was held on April 27, 2022 at the Tokyo Culture Culture venue and was broadcast on Stardom's YouTube channel.

Jushin Liger joined the commentary table for the night. On the third match of the night, Mayu Iwatani defeated Thekla to win the SWA World Championship and being one title away from winning all of Stardom's possible championships. Iwatani was also billed as the second "grand slam champion" of Stardom alongside Io Shirai. The fifth match saw God's Eye's Syuri, Mirai, Ami Sourei and a briefly returning Konami picking up a victory over Donna Del Mondo (Giulia, Himeka, Natsupoi and Mai Sakurai). The following bout saw Hazuki and Koguma recapturing the Goddess of Stardom Championship from Momo Watanabe and Starlight Kid. They became the first team to ever win the titles on more than one occasion.

The main event portraited the confrontation between Saya Kamitani and Maika for the Wonder of Stardom Championship, match which solded with Kamitani retaining her title. After the victory, Cinderella Tournament winner Mirai stepped up to remind Kamitani of their title match from Stardom Flashing Champions which was set to occur on May 28, 2022.

Results

References

External links
Page Stardom World

2022 in professional wrestling
Women's professional wrestling shows
World Wonder Ring Stardom